Hitron Technologies is a Taiwanese company founded in 1986 as a telecommunication equipment supplier and headquartered in Hsinchu City, Taiwan.

History 
In March 1986, Hitron founded on agency of electronic equipment. It begin with 9 employees and NT$8,000,000 in capital.
In 1987, Hitron entered IT and communication industries.
In 1989, Hitron entered in the field of GIS.
In 1996, Hitron constructed HtNet to provide dial-up internet access service as an Internet service provider. The URL is www.ht.net.tw then.
In 1997, Hitron entered in wireless transmission market.
In December 1998, IPO on Taiwan's OTC 
In September 2000, listing of shares switched to Taiwan's main board.
In December 2000, Hitron released 70% share of APOL to EBT.
In 2001, Hitron started using the 2nd generation Corporate Identity System.
In November 2002, Hitron began to build up the factory in Hsinchu Science Park.
In 2003, Digital Media Department in Hitron is independent as Interactive Digital Technologies, Inc.  
In 2005, wholly owned subsidiary launched in Suzhou, China 
In 2010, office opened in Shenzhen, China 
In 2011, office opened in Amsterdam, the Netherlands 
In 2011, first American office opened in Denver, United States
In 2012, SI spun off from Hitron as IDT
In 2015, Hitron started using the 3rd generation Corporate Identity System
In 2015, new factory expansion in Suzhou, China
In 2015, wholly owned subsidiary: InnoAuto Technologies Inc.  launched in Hsinchu County, Taiwan.  Expanded to Automotive electronics industry.
In 2016, 30th Anniversary
In 2019, received investment from Alpha Networks
In 2020, started operating new manufacturing center in Haiphong, Vietnam

Products- Cable Broadband 
Cable CPE: Cable Modem, eMTA, Wireless Gateway, Wireless Voice, Gateway IPTV
Home Networking devices: Wifi Extender, MoCA ECB
Module: DOCSIS 2.0, DOCSIS 3.0, DOCSIS 3.1
Infrastructure: Outdoor Cable Modem, Proactive Network, Management System, DOCSIS Probe
5G Small Cell Backhaul Solutions
Coax Network Testing Tools

References

External links 
Hitron Technologies Inc.

1986 establishments in Taiwan
Companies based in Hsinchu
Companies established in 1986
Companies listed on the Taiwan Stock Exchange